Vetlanda BK is a bandy club in Vetlanda, Sweden.

Vetlanda BK was established in December 1944. While the exact date seems to be unknown, 6 December is usually credited. On 1 January 1945 the club played its first game, 4–4 on away soil against Flugeby.

The home arena is called Sapa Arena. The team colour is yellow. Vetlanda BK has won the Swedish bandy championship three times, 1986, 1991 and 1992 and European Cup once, 1991

Squad

Honours

Domestic
 Swedish Champions:
 Winners (3): 1986, 1991, 1992
 Runners-up (4): 1988, 1989, 1994, 1995

International
 European Cup:
 Winners (1): 1991

References

External links
Official website
Sapa Arena

 
Bandy clubs in Sweden
Sport in Jönköping County
Bandy clubs established in 1944
1944 establishments in Sweden